Michael J. Thomas may refer to:
 Mike Thomas (athletic director), American university administrator
 Michael J Thomas, American saxophonist, songwriter, and vocalist